is a Japanese football player who plays for Sagan Tosu.

National team career
In June 2005, Kobayashi was selected Japan U-20 national team for 2005 World Youth Championship. At this tournament, he played full time in all 4 matches as defensive midfielder.

Club statistics

Honours

Club
Kashiwa Reysol
J2 League: 2010

Yokohama F. Marinos
Emperor's Cup: 2013

References

External links

Profile at Sagan Tosu

1985 births
Living people
People from Hamura, Tokyo
Association football people from Tokyo Metropolis
Japanese footballers
Japan youth international footballers
J1 League players
J2 League players
Kashiwa Reysol players
Yokohama F. Marinos players
Sagan Tosu players
Association football defenders